Rubens Fadini (10 June 1927 – 4 May 1949) was an Italian professional footballer who played as a midfielder.

Club career
Born in Jolanda di Savoia, in the province of Ferrara, he emigrated to Milan at a young age with his family. He began playing football in Milanese youth league: the Dopolavoro Ceretti & Tanfani di Milano.

With Ceretti he won two regional titles in Milan in 1941–42 and 1942–43 and the title of Regionale della Sezione Propaganda (losing the overall title of regional championship in a youth match on 18 July 1943, defeated by A.C. Milan 6–1 on field of Pirelli alla Bicocca).

After the war he was signed by Gallaratese, who competed in the Alta Italia. He stayed here for three years.

He was acquired by Torino in his early twenties. In the final game of the season, before the Superga air disaster, he replaced an injured Valentino Mazzola against Inter Milan in Milan.

He died in the Superga air disaster aged 21. He had played 10 games in Serie A, scoring a goal in a home win by 4–1 against Milan on 6 March 1949.

Fadini was buried in the cemetery of Arcore.

Honours

 Torino
 Serie A: 1948–49

References

External links
Profile on Giulianovaweb.it
Profile on enciclopediadelcalcio.it

1927 births
1949 deaths
Italian footballers
Serie A players
Torino F.C. players
Association football midfielders
Footballers killed in the Superga air disaster
S.G. Gallaratese A.S.D. players